Francis Henry Esmond Thompson (born 1929) was a Northern Irish politician with the Ulster Unionist Party (UUP).

Born in Maghera, Thompson served with the Royal Navy and later the Ulster Defence Regiment. He subsequently served as sub-postmaster at Maghera Post Office for 41 years, retiring in 2001.

He served as a member of the UUP executive from 1971, still being in position as of 1994. He also represented the party as a member of the Northern Ireland Constitutional Convention for Mid-Ulster and as a member of Magherafelt District Council from 1977 to 1981. In November 1975, he was convicted of unlawful possession of a firearm, which he claimed he owned for his own protection.  In March 1977, he was shot in the arm in what was described as an assassination attempt, although he received only minor injuries.

Thompson was known as a hard-line member of the UUP and had publicly criticised party colleague John Taylor during the life of the Constitutional Convention, feeling that Taylor was soft on proposals for power-sharing with the Social Democratic and Labour Party that had been proposed by William Craig. In later years he was associated with the anti-Good Friday Agreement wing of the party and was a strong critic of the leadership of David Trimble.

References

1929 births
Possibly living people
Members of the Northern Ireland Constitutional Convention
Members of Magherafelt District Council
Ulster Unionist Party politicians
Royal Navy sailors
Ulster Defence Regiment soldiers
People from Maghera